Hugo Bardin (born June 30, 1991), known professionally as Paloma, is a French drag performer, singer, director and screenwriter. She is best known for winning the first debut season of Drag Race France.

Early life 
Hugo Bardin was born on June 30, 1991. He took his first theater lessons at the age of four, which gave rise to his desire to work in this field. After the baccalaureate, which he obtained in Clermont-Ferrand, his hometown, he continued his studies at Cours Florent, in Paris. During this time, he exercised several professions in the field of theatre, in particular an actor, but also a director or a wigmaker.

Career 
Bardin's first experience as a drag queen dates back to 2008, in a staging of the play called "Nur eine Scheibe Brot" by Rainer Werner Fassbinder, performed at the Comédie de Clermont-Ferrand. However, Bardin did not immediately continue in the field of drag performance professionally, instead favoring his career as an actor. During this period, Bardin felt compelled to "be more masculine," to obtain better success in his auditions. Conversely, performing in drag offered him an opportunity to "be whoever I want, kind of like a superhero," which ultimately inspired Bardin to pursue drag more seriously.

In 2018, Bardin debuted the character of Paloma. Paloma's Spanish-sounding first name was greatly inspired by the cinema of Pedro Almodóvar, and also recalls Paloma Picasso.

In 2022, Paloma's eponymous short film, directed by herself, and was released at festivals. On June 2, 2022, it was announced that she was one of the ten candidates participating in the first season of Drag Race France. At the end of the finale, she won against Soa de Muse and La Grande Dame.

Discography

Singles

As a lead artist

As a featured artist

Filmography

Television

Web series

Short film

References 

1991 births
Living people
Drag Race (franchise) winners
Drag Race France contestants
French drag queens